George Grantham (born January 20, 1947) is an American drummer and vocalist best known for his work with pioneering country rock band Poco.

Grantham and pedal steel guitarist Rusty Young were members of the Denver-based psychedelic rock act Boenzee Cryque when Young left the band in mid-1968 for Los Angeles. There, Young fell in with Buffalo Springfield members Richie Furay and Jim Messina as they wrapped up that band's final album.

With Buffalo Springfield disintegrated, Furay, Messina, and Young joined together to create a new band, originally named "Pogo" but then shortly rechristened "Poco" after copyright concerns forced a change.

The band needed a drummer, and Young recruited Grantham, who became part of Poco's founding line-up. Grantham's backup vocals were an important element of the band's distinctive harmony sound.

Grantham remained a member of various Poco line-ups through 1977, a span of ten studio albums and two live releases.  He returned in 1985, and was part of four of five band incarnations before departing again 1990.

Reunited once more in 2000, he suffered a debilitating stroke in 2004 and was unable to rejoin the band again until some vocals-only appearances in 2009.

See also
 Poco discography

References

1947 births
Living people
People from New Cordell, Oklahoma
American male singers
Singers from Oklahoma
Poco members
20th-century American drummers
American male drummers
20th-century American male musicians